Thomas Eugene Regner (April 19, 1944 – November 13, 2014) was a professional American football player who played guard for six seasons for the Houston Oilers and was an All-American offensive lineman for the University of Notre Dame. He was traded along with a 1973 third-round selection (61st overall–Bill Olds) from the Oilers to the Baltimore Colts for Bill Curry on January 29, 1973.

References

1944 births
2014 deaths
All-American college football players
American football offensive guards
Houston Oilers players
Notre Dame Fighting Irish football players
Sportspeople from Kenosha, Wisconsin
Players of American football from Wisconsin
Sportspeople from the Chicago metropolitan area
American Football League players